St. Francis Higher Secondary School is a Roman Catholic School situated in Akhnoor, Jammu.

Overview 
The School was established on 4 October 1983 by Fr. Sebastian Thottumkal, OFM Cap. Schools first principal was Sr. Anne CSST. The School has been recognized by the education department of Jammu and Kashmir and is affiliated to Jammu and Kashmir State Board of School Education (J&K BOSE). The school has classes from LKG to XII. It admits both girls and boys. The school is run by the Diocesan Board of School Education of the Roman Catholic Diocese of Jammu-Srinagar.

See also 
 List of Schools in India
 List of Christian Schools in India

References

Educational institutions established in 1983
Catholic schools in India
Private schools in Jammu and Kashmir
Christian schools in Jammu and Kashmir